Motuloa or Motulua is a very small island on the north of Nukufetau in Tuvalu. It is an oval with a length of 200 m, and lies between Teafuanonu (on the west) and Teafuaniua (on the east).

See also
 Islands of Tuvalu
 Motuloa
 Savave

References

Islands of Tuvalu
Pacific islands claimed under the Guano Islands Act
Nukufetau

hu:Motuloa (Nukufetau északi része)